Heteronympha banksii, or Banks's brown butterfly, is a medium-sized butterfly of the family Nymphalidae found in Australia.

References

External links

Satyrini
Butterflies of Australia
Butterflies described in 1814
Taxa named by William Elford Leach